San José de Colinas is a town, with a population of 5,215 (2013 census), and a municipality in the Honduran department of Santa Bárbara.

The municipality has an estimated population of 19,771 in 2020.

San José de Colinas is a colorful city located two hours drive from San Pedro Sula.

Municipality
The municipality counts 34 villages, of which the most important is San Miguel of lajas, with a population of 828.

Demographics
At the time of the 2013 Honduras census, San José de Colinas municipality had a population of 18,791. Of these, 74.57% were Mestizo, 24.34% White, 0.74% Indigenous, 0.29% Black or Afro-Honduran and 0.06% others.

Tourism

Tourist sites include a Catholic church that dates from 1930 by the creeks of the Jicatuyo River.

Sports
The local football team, Cruz Azul, plays in the Honduran second division.

References

Municipalities of the Santa Bárbara Department, Honduras